Stephen John (born 21 June 1974) is a Pakistani cricket coach and former first-class cricketer who played for Islamabad.

References

External links
 

1974 births
Living people
Pakistani cricketers
Cricketers from Sialkot
Pakistani Christians
Islamabad cricketers
Pakistan Customs cricketers
Khan Research Laboratories cricketers
Quetta Bears cricketers
Pakistani cricket coaches